Russia–South Africa relations are foreign relations between Russia and South Africa. Full diplomatic relations were established between both countries in 1942 as the Soviet Union. Russia has an embassy in Pretoria and a consulate-general in Cape Town. South Africa has an embassy in Moscow. Both countries are also members of BRICS.

History

Early relations

In 1896, the Transvaal Republic established diplomatic relations with Russia. The Boer war was extensively covered by the Russian media and numerous books, articles, plays, pamphlets and poems were published about the war, usually with a pronounced pro-Boer slant. One Russian writer complained: "Wherever you go these days you hear the same story – the Boers, the Boers and only the Boers". The national anthem of the Transvaal Transvaal, Transvaal, My Country was frequently played by Russian orchestras, numerous committees were founded to collect money for the Transvaal, and church services offered up prayers for a British defeat. In countless newspaper serials and novels, the men of the kommandos were portrayed as heroes battling the arrogant British. Such was the popular enthusiasm that inns, restaurants, and cafés were given Afrikaans names and redecorated in the "Boer style" to improve business.

The British historian R.W. Johnson wrote: "Russian conservatives were pro-Boer not only for the usual nationalist, anti-British reasons but because they thought the Boers were like the best sort of Russians – conservative, rural, Christian folk resisting the invasion of their land by foreign (especially Jewish) capitalists." One Moscow newspaper in an editorial stated: "The deep historical meaning of this war is that faith, patriotism . . . the patriarchal family, primordial tribal unity, iron discipline and the complete lack of so-called modern civilisation have . . . become such an invincible force that even the seemingly invincible British have begun to tremble." However, though several hundred Russians did make their way to fight for the Transvaal, upon arriving they were often shocked by the corruption of the Transvaal government, its disorganized ways, and the casual brutality of the Afrikaners towards blacks.

Apartheid era
The Soviet Union withdrew its ambassador after the Sharpeville massacre in 1960. After South Africa became a republic in 1961, relations were very cold. South Africa considered the Soviet Union an enemy because it financially and militarily supported communism on the African continent. During the South African Border War, the Soviets supplied and trained SWAPO and MPLA fighters. However, by the late 1980s, Soviet interference in Africa minimized and relations between the two slightly warmed as the Cold War was ending.

Despite the widely reported Soviet support for the ANC and otherwise liberation movements, the Soviet Union also engaged in some trade with South Africa during the apartheid era, mostly involving arms and some mineral resources. From 1960 to 1964, De Beers had a unique arrangement to market Soviet diamonds from Siberia. During the 1980s, a convoluted series of arms sales involving the Stasi, the Danish ship Pia Vesta, and Manuel Noriega of Panama ultimately aimed to transfer Soviet arms and military vehicles to South Africa. Around this time, the South African military's Armscor had a team of experts working in Leningrad involved in jet engine development.

Post-apartheid era

Directly after the collapse of the Soviet Union, South Africa recognized the Russian Federation in December 1991 and established diplomatic relations on February 28, 1992 becoming the first African nation to do so. In 1993 the two countries signed trade agreements which was followed by the signing of a military cooperation agreement in 1995. The April 1999 visit to Russia by President Nelson Mandela started a period of warming relations between the two countries.

During the presidency of Jacob Zuma Russian-South Africa ties warmed significantly as the Putin administration sought to move a strategic country away from the West and gain a foothold in Africa; for its part South Africa sought to distance itself from Western actions in Libya during the fall of Muammar Gaddafi. South Africa joined the BRICS group of nations in 2010, a key foreign policy goal of the Zuma administration, with the active support of the Russian Federation. This period also saw a period of closer ties with South Africa’s security apparatus as members of South Africa's State Security Agency traveled to Russia for training and the country sought to build its own satellite surveillance capabilities with Russian assistance. During the Zuma administration bilateral agreements on agriculture, arts and culture, defence, education, energy, fisheries, mining, science and technology and transport were signed with Russia. Through his presidency Zuma made a number of medically related trips to Russia to receive treatment for alleged incidents of poisoning.

Despite a very slight cooling of relations during the administration of President  Cyril Ramaphosa support for Russia remains strong amongst the political left in South Africa who support Russia's stance challenging the hegemony of the United States and what they see as a country that supports a global order based on international law and respect for the principle of non-interference in the internal affairs.

Nuclear deal 
As part of an effort to resolve the South African energy crisis the Russian government offered to build and operate up to eight nuclear power plants at a cost of R1 trillion (US$66 billion). Both the Russian government and the administration of South African president Jacob Zuma put pressure on the South African government to force through the deal by attempting to circumvent South Africa's procurement laws. Then South African Finance Minister Nhlanhla Nene gave testimony to the Zondo Commission that he was fired for not approving a US$100 billion version of the deal in 2015. The deal was canceled by court order in April 2017.

Alleged Russian electoral interference 
Prior to the conclusion of the 2019 South African general election allegations that Russia was conducting an influence operation to support the reelection of the ruling African National Congress (ANC). The Daily Maverick and Guardian newspapers reported that Putin associate Yevgeny Prigozhin worked to undermine support for the Democratic Alliance and Economic Freedom Fighters while increasing support for the ANC. The Daily Maverick and Dossier Center report stated that Russian political analysis worked "under the auspices of Afric and the International Anti-Crisis Center" to conduct an influence-buying and disinformation campaign. The Russian embassy in South Africa denied the accusation and stated that the accusation does "not stand [up to] basic scrutiny."

Russian invasion of Ukraine 

In response to the 2014 annexation of Crimea by the Russian Federation, the Zuma administration avoided criticizing Russia, arguing instead for BRICS members to unite in order to defend common interests of the group.

The South African government was initially critical of Russia's 2022 invasion of Ukraine calling on the country to "immediately withdraw its  forces from Ukraine in line with the United Nations Charter." However these statements were soon withdrawn and in an effort to repair Russian-South African relations. President Ramaphosa reportedly disciplined International Relations and Cooperation Minister Naledi Pandor for making the statement on behalf of the government. Despite the invasion and resulting international diplomatic condemnation Russian-South Africa relations have reportedly remained strong with South Africa being one of 35 countries  to abstain from a subsequent United Nations vote demanding that Russia withdraw from Ukraine.

In response to public criticism by the South African media of the South African government's non-critical position towards Russia minister Pandor has postulated that the local media might be "part of orchestrated propaganda campaign" by presenting a "narrative which has tended to support the actions of the big powers." During the war Russian Defence Minister Sergei Shoigu described South Africa as a "friendly state" and that South Africa's support has helped counter NATO pressure on Russia.

A sanctioned Russian cargo ship that had turned off its marine tracking system, the Lady R, made a controversial and unannounced port call that the Naval Base in Simon’s Town in the early morning of 6 December 2022 whereupon she was loaded and unloaded with cargo under armed guard at night and departed three days later. The secrecy surrounding the docking and lack of any comment on it by the South African and Russian governments was noted in the media.

Economic ties 
South African exports to Russia are dominated by food products and capital equipment.

As of 2022 South African companies have invested R77 billion (US$5.13 billion) in Russia. This includes investments by major South African companies such as Naspers (owner of Mail.ru), AB Inbev (formally SABMiller) and Barloworld. South Africa has invested a further R25 billion in the BRICS bank thereby further tying the country to Russia. Russia's investments in South Africa in the same period amounted to R23 billion (US$1.5 billion).

See also
Foreign relations of Russia
Foreign relations of South Africa

References

External links

  Documents on the Russia – South Africa relationship from the Russian Ministry of Foreign Affairs
 Embassy of Russia in Pretoria
  South African Department of Foreign Affaires about the relation with Russia
  Embassy of South Africa in Moscow

 
Africa–Russia relations